Song and Dance Man is a 1936 American drama film directed by Allan Dwan, written by Maude Fulton, adapted from the play by George M. Cohan. It stars Claire Trevor, Paul Kelly, Michael Whalen, Ruth Donnelly, James Burke and Helen Troy. It was released on March 11, 1936, by 20th Century Fox.

Plot

Cast 
Claire Trevor as Julia Carroll
Paul Kelly as Hap Farrell
Michael Whalen as Alan Davis
Ruth Donnelly as Patsy O'Madigan
James Burke as Lt. Mike Boyle
Helen Troy as Sally
Lester Matthews as C. B. Nelson
Ralf Harolde as Crosby
Gloria Roy as Dolores
Margaret Dumont as Mrs. Whitney
Billy Bevan as Curtis
Irene Franklin as Goldie McGuffy
Jean Porter as Girl

See also
The Song and Dance Man (1926)

References

External links 

 
 

1936 films
American drama films
1936 drama films
20th Century Fox films
Films directed by Allan Dwan
American black-and-white films
Remakes of American films
1930s English-language films
1930s American films